Allan Collins (24 January 1918 – 10 April 2002) was a Scottish footballer who played for Kilmarnock,  Raith Rovers and Stenhousemuir in the Scottish Football League either side of the Second World War. Collins was part of the Kilmarnock side in the 1938 Scottish Cup Final, which they lost to East Fife after a replay.

References

1918 births
2002 deaths
Scottish footballers
Footballers from Kilmarnock
Association football forwards
Scottish Football League players
Cumnock Juniors F.C. players
Kilmarnock F.C. players
Raith Rovers F.C. players
Stenhousemuir F.C. players
Scottish Junior Football Association players